Fima Sporting or Clubes de Fitun Matebian Sporting Baucau are a football team from Baucau. That play in the Super Liga Timorense.

References

Football clubs in East Timor
Football
Baucau Municipality